Exocoelactiidae is a family of sea anemones belonging to the order Actiniaria.

Genera:
 Exocoelactis Carlgren, 1925

References

Actiniaria
Cnidarian families